Alejandro Fernández (born 1971) is a Mexican singer.

Alejandro Fernández may also refer to:
 Alejandro Fernández (racing driver) (born 1996), Colombian racing driver
 Alejandro Fernández (sport shooter) (born 1959), Mexican sport shooter
 Álex Fernández (born 1992), Spanish footballer, full name Alejandro Fernández Iglesias
 Jano (footballer, born 1980), Spanish footballer, full name Alejandro Fernández Vázquez
 Alejandro Fernández de Araoz (1894–1970), Spanish banker
 Alejandro Fernández Almendras (born 1971), Chilean filmmaker
 Alejandro Fernández (politician) (born 1976), Spanish politician
 Alejandro Fernández Sordo (1921–2009), Spanish politician

See also
 Alex Fernandez (disambiguation)